Lysimachia borealis (synonym Trientalis borealis), the starflower, is a North American woodland perennial that blooms between May and June.

Description
Starflowers have creeping rhizomes with 5- vertical stalks. Each stalk has a whorl of 5–10 lanceolate leaves (up to 8 cm long) at its tip, with 1-4 (most often one or two) white flowers on smaller stalks extending from the center of the whorl. Its fruit is tiny, globe-shaped, pale blue and matte

Conservation status
Starflower is listed as endangered by Georgia and Kentucky and is listed as threatened by Illinois and Tennessee.

References

Northern Starflower, borealforest.org
Wildflowers of Minnesota's Northwoods pamphlet, 1999, Minnesota DNR

borealis
Flora of North America
Plants described in 1808